KQPT may refer to:

 KQPT-LP, a low-power radio station (106.1 FM) licensed to serve Sacramento, California, United States
 KZSZ, a radio station (107.5 FM) licensed to serve Colusa, California, which held the call sign KQPT from 2000 to 2019